Maxim Thorne is an American lawyer and civil rights advocate who teaches on philanthropy at Yale University. He is the founder of JusticeInvestor, a litigation crowdfunding company focused on environmental and social justice cases. He became a Senior Vice-President of the NAACP in 2008, where he helped establish the first LGBT Task Force. Thorne helped argue Abbott v. Burke on behalf of Head Start and the NAACP.

Early life and education
Thorne was born in Georgetown, Guyana on 24 November 1964. He spent his early years in Nassau, Bahamas along with his sister, Katya, attending St. Thomas Moore's Primary School, until he was 10, then returned to Guyana where he attended St. Margaret's Primary School and Queen's College. His mother, Eslyn Thorne, who is of mixed Indian and Chinese descent, met his father, who is also multi-ethnic (Black, Scottish, Indian and Chinese), while in Georgetown, Guyana. Thorne immigrated to the United States in 1984. He is the great-grandson of Alfred A. Thorne, a human rights advocate and educator in British Guiana.

Thorne holds a bachelor's degree with cum laude honours in economics and political science from Yale College and a JD from Yale Law School.

Career
In 2012 he taught "Philanthropy in Action" at Yale, where a gift by an anonymous donor allowed students to donate $100,000 to charitable causes.

Thorne became Managing Director of The Andrew Goodman Foundation in 2016. 
Thorne was appointed Executive Vice-President of the Paley Center for Media in 2013.

Previously he was chief operating officer at Human Rights Campaign, and Vice-President at Human Rights Campaign Foundation.

Formerly, Thorne was Executive Director of New Jersey Head Start, an association of all the Head Start Programs in New Jersey. While at the NJHSA, he oversaw the implementation of Abbott v. Burke, the New Jersey Supreme Court decision that mandated parity in funding and Whole School Reform. Thorne joined the Passaic County Legal Aid Society (PCLAS) in 1996, and promoted to Deputy Director in June 1998. He and the Executive Director, John Atlas,  created  the Community and Economic Development law unit in 1997, the first in New Jersey, that represented and empowered faith-based and other community groups that were solving housing and education problems in Passaic County’s low-income neighborhoods.  Among many innovations, Thorne created Cable TV programs: Know Your Rights, Working Together for Equal Justice, and Education in Your Neighborhood. As the head of the law unit he had represented Head Start, the New Jersey NAACP State Conference, and daycare centres in later litigation (Abbott VIII). For this and other efforts the Passaic Legal Aid Society won the first annual "Lawyer as Problem Solver Award" of the American Bar Association in 2002.[14]https://casetext.com/case/abbott-v-burke-20

Personal life
Thorne is openly gay.

References

External links
 Essay: New Political and Legal Strategies for African-Americans: Dreaming Big, Dreaming Creatively
 Interview with Mildred Bond Roxborough for NPR's StoryCorps
 Yale Daily News article on Maxim Thorne presiding over the Yale Afro-American Cultural Center 2009 Gala
 Maxim Thorne, testifying before the US Congress's LGBT Equality Caucus on the Census, Co-Chaired by Tammy Baldwin (D-WI) and Barney Frank (D-MA), and Jared Polis (D-CO), April 1, 2010

1964 births
Living people
American chief executives
American people of Chinese descent
LGBT African Americans
American philanthropists
American Rhodes Scholars
Yale Law School alumni
People from Georgetown, Guyana
Alumni of Queen's College, Guyana
American LGBT businesspeople
Yale College alumni